The 29th General Assembly of Prince Edward Island was in session from March 20, 1883, to June 5, 1886. The majority party was the Conservative Party led by William Wilfred Sullivan.

There were four sessions of the 29th General Assembly:

The speaker was John A. MacDonald.

Members

Notes:

External links
  Election results for the Prince Edward Island Legislative Assembly, 1883-05-08
 Prince Edward Island, garden province of Canada, WH Crosskill (1904)

Terms of the General Assembly of Prince Edward Island
1883 establishments in Prince Edward Island
1886 disestablishments in Prince Edward Island